Taylor Dent was the champion in 2009, but he retired in the first round match, against Oleksandr Nedovyesov due to fatigue.Bobby Reynolds won the title after defeating Lester Cook in the final 6–3, 6–3.

Seeds

Draw

Finals

Top half

Bottom half

References
Main Draw
Qualifying Singles

2010 ATP Challenger Tour
2010 Singles